Dens may refer to:
 Den (disambiguation)
Dens, on the axis vertebra, also known as odontoid process or odontoid peg
Tooth